Antispila viticordifoliella is a species of moth of the  family Heliozelidae. Research suggests that two species might be involved under this name, one feeding on Vitis species which is found in Kentucky and Pennsylvania and the other on Parthenocissus species, which is found in Ontario, Connecticut, Florida, New York and Vermont.

The larvae feed on Vitis vulpina and Parthenocissus quinquefolia. They mine the leaves of their host plant. On Parthenocissus quinquefolia, the mine is without a gallery at the start and has the form of an elliptic elongate blotch, often running along or near the leaf margin. The frass is sometimes grouped in a clump, but more typically spread in an irregular broad line. The larvae are yellow with almost black head.

References

Moths described in 1860
Heliozelidae